The Humber River Golf Resort is a public golf course located in western Newfoundland, near the town of Deer Lake, Canada.

The Course
Named after the Humber River that borders the course, this 9-hole course offers golfers of all levels a fun golfing experience amidst a tranquil and lush rural landscape. The spacious clubhouse offers views of the fourth and ninth greens from the balcony. Each is hole is completely separate, with narrow fairways lined with spruce and fir trees. The lush greens were designed with subtle undulations and are surrounded by strategically placed sand traps.

See also
List of golf courses in Newfoundland and Labrador

References

Golf clubs and courses in Newfoundland and Labrador